3,3-Dimethylpentane is one of the isomers of heptane. 3,3-Dimethylpentane has a boiling point of 86.0 °C and melting point of −134.9 °C. Its density is 0.6934. The refractive index is 1.39092 at 20 °C.

Preparation
A method to produce 3,3-dimethylpentane is to react tert-amyl chloride (CH3CH2(CH3)C2Cl) with propionaldehyde producing 3,3-dimethylpentan-2-ol. This is then dehydrated to produce 3,3-dimethylpent-2-ene, which when hydrogenated produces some 3,3-dimethylpentane, but also 2,3-dimethylpentane.

Properties
In 1929 Graham Edgar and George Calingaert made 3,3-dimethylpentane and measured its physical characteristics for the first time. The measurements were at 20 °C, not the standard conditions used in later times.

For 3,3-dimethylpentane they measured a density of 0.6934 at 20 °C with a rate of change Δd/ΔT of 0.000848. The dielectric constant is 1.940. The refractive index at 20° is 1.39114. The adiabatic compressibility is 0.00011455 and isothermal compressibility is 0.00014513 atmospheres. The velocity of sound is 1.1295 km/s. Coefficient of thermal expansion is 0.002467/°. Surface tension is 19.63 dynes/cm. Viscosity is 0.00454. The heat of combustion is 11470 cal/g which is very similar to other heptanes.

References

Alkanes